St. Paul's Episcopal Church is an Episcopal parish church in Peoria, Illinois, United States. It is the former cathedral of the Diocese of Quincy.

History

St. Paul's parish was founded as St. Jude's in 1834. The church was located on the southwest corner of Main and Monroe Streets.  The parish's name was changed to St. Paul in 1848.

The parish outgrew its sandstone and wood building and updating the facility on a small plot of land was deemed impractical, so property was purchased outside of the downtown area. The present church building was completed in 1959 and it was consecrated in 1963. On May 7, 1962, St. Paul's was named the cathedral church of the Diocese of Quincy. An addition to accommodate diocesan offices was completed in 1968.

A majority of the parishes in the Diocese of Quincy left the Episcopal Church and joined the Anglican Church of the Southern Cone in November 2008. In 2012 the remaining parishes in the Episcopal Diocese of Quincy, including St. Paul's, approached the Diocese of Chicago about reunification. The two dioceses unanimously agreed to reunite on June 8, 2013. Part of the reunification agreement included St. Paul's becoming a parish church again and ceasing being a cathedral.

References

External links

Official site

Religious organizations established in 1834
Churches completed in 1959
20th-century Episcopal church buildings
Episcopal church buildings in Illinois
Modernist architecture in Illinois
Churches in Peoria, Illinois
Former cathedrals in the United States
1834 establishments in Illinois